The Rochester Alternative Learning Center caters to secondary school students with a range of learning difficulties in Rochester, Minnesota, United States.

References

External links
 Rochester Alternative Learning Center

Schools in Olmsted County, Minnesota